Aregha is a genus of moths in the family Gelechiidae. It contains the species Aregha abhaustella, which is found in Algeria.

References

Gelechiinae
Monotypic moth genera
Moths of Africa